Udo Ulfkotte (20 January 1960 – 13 January 2017) was a German journalist and conspiracy theorist who maintained that journalists (including himself) and leading newspapers published material that had been fed to them, or bought, by the CIA and other Western intelligence and propaganda agencies. Several media outlets rejected Ulfkotte's claims as frivolous. He was a political journalist for the German main daily newspaper Frankfurter Allgemeine Zeitung (FAZ) for several years until 2003. From the end of the 1990s, he wrote several bestsellers and increasingly advocated right-wing populist, Islamophobic, and conspiracy-theory positions.

Career
Ulfkotte studied jurisprudence and politics in Freiburg and London.  Between 1986 and 1998, Ulfkotte lived predominantly in Iraq, Iran, Afghanistan, Saudi Arabia, Oman, United Arab Emirates, Egypt and Jordan.

Ulfkotte was on the staff of the Konrad Adenauer Foundation from 1999 to 2003.

Political activism
Ulfkotte was involved in the far-right Pro Germany Citizens' Movement. In June 2007, he signed the anti-Islam organisation Federal Association of Citizens' Movements (BDB)'s "Wertheimer Appell" against their supposed "creeping Islamisation" of Germany. The BDB merged with Ulfkotte's Pax Europa organisation to form the Citizens' Movement Pax Europa (BPE), but Ulfkotte left this in 2008 after an internal dispute. Pax Europa was affiliated to the anti-Muslim Stop Islamisation of Europe (SIOE) alliance and approached the far-right Belgian party Vlaams Belang (VB) for their assistance. It worked with them to organise an anti-Islamic 9/11 anniversary march in Brussels in 2007, but mayor Freddy Thielemans refused to license it and it was eventually cancelled, leading to a split between Ulfkotte and SIOE.

Ulfkotte had planned to run for the Hamburg local elections in 2008, as number two on the Centre Party's list, but later withdrew in June/July 2007. In July 2007, Ulfkotte announced he would found a new national party, but this effort failed.

Ulfkotte was a speaker at rallies of the right-wing anti-Islam Pegida movement and the right-wing party AfD.

Bought Journalists
In 2014, Ulfkotte's book Gekaufte Journalisten (German Bought Journalists: How Politicians, Intelligence Agencies and High Finance Control Germany’s Mass Media) was published. In this work, he stated that the CIA and other secret services pay money to journalists to report stories in a certain light. According to Ulfkotte, the CIA and German intelligence (BND) bribe journalists in Germany to write pro-NATO propaganda articles, and it is well understood that one may lose their media job if they fail to comply with the pro-Western agenda. This is part of a larger pattern of media corruption he describes in the book. An English translation was released under the title Presstitutes. Several media outlets rejected Ulfkotte's claims as frivolous.

Der Spiegel observed that "Ulfkotte's book was published by Kopp, a melting pot for conspiracy theorists. Kopp publishes works by ufologists, and by authors who claim the Americans destroyed the Twin Towers of the World Trade Center themselves in 2001. Ulfkotte's book was on the bestseller lists for months. According to the magazine, "Bought Journalists is the bible of all those who have renounced their faith in the German media. Ulfkotte's critics see the book as a vendetta against the FAZ, which he left on bad terms."

Death
Ulfkotte died from a heart attack on 13 January 2017 at the age of 56, having suffered from several such health emergences previously.

Works
  Presstitutes Embedded in the Pay of the CIA: A Confession from the Profession  Progressive Press (October 18, 2019), . In English.

The following works are all written in German. English translations of the titles are included here.

  Journalists for Hire: How the CIA Buys the News  Next Revelation Press (May 15, 2017), 
  Holy War in Europe.  Eichborn, Frankfurt/Main, 2007, 
  The War in the Dark. The True Power of the Secret Services.  Eichborn, Frankfurt/Main, 2006, 
  The War in our Cities. As Radical Islamics Infiltrate Germany.  Eichborn, Frankfurt/Main 2003, 
  Restaurant economics.  Goldmann, Munich 2001, 
  Classified Material Federal Intelligence Service.  Koehler und Amelang, Munich, Berlin 1997, 
  Over work and Expenditure for Paperback.  Heyne, Munich updated 1998, 
  Prophets of the Terror. The Secret Network of the Islamics.  Goldmann, Munich 2001, 
  Journalists Lie in Such a Way. The Fight for Ratios and Editions. Bertelsmann, Munich 2001, 
  Gene Code J.  Novel, Eichborn, Frankfurt/Main, 2001, 
  Market Place of the Thieves.  Bertelsmann, Munich, 1999, 
  Boundless Criminality. What politics and mass media keep silent about the crimes committed by migrants. Bertelsmann, Munich 2004,

References

External links
 Udo Ulfkotte Homepage (Much of this is in German; includes "Whistleblower" newsletter)
 e.g., The World Upside Down – October 2006
 
 "German Wilders" attacks Islam, Radio Netherlands Worldwide, 13 June 2007

1960 births
2017 deaths
Counter-jihad activists
People from Lippstadt
German journalists
German male journalists
German newspaper journalists
20th-century German journalists
21st-century German journalists
University of Freiburg alumni
German political scientists
German critics of Islam
German Christians
Alumni of the University of London
German male writers
German conspiracy theorists
Frankfurter Allgemeine Zeitung people